Cyclin-O is a protein that in humans is encoded by the CCNO gene.

Interactions 

Cyclin O has been shown to interact with RPA2 and PCNA.

References

Further reading

External links